Homage to Duke is an album by American pianist Dave Grusin released in 1993, recorded for GRP Records, and is Grusin's interpretation of Duke Ellington's music.

The album was well received. In addition to Mood Indigo winning the 1994 Grammy Award for Best Instrumental Arrangement, Scott Yanow of AllMusic praised this effort as "a respectful and well-conceived tribute".

The Orchestral Album reached No. 2 on Billboard's Jazz chart.

Track listing
"Cotton Tail" (Duke Ellington) - 4:10
"Things Ain't What They Used to Be" (Mercer Ellington, Ted Persons) - 6:45
"Satin Doll" (Duke Ellington, Billy Strayhorn, Irving Mills)- 5:22
"Mood Indigo" (Duke Ellington, Barney Bigard, Irving Mills) - 5:20
"Just Squeeze Me (But Please Don't Tease Me)" (Duke Ellington, Lee Gaines) - 4:56
"Caravan" (Juan Tizol) - 6:16
"East St. Louis Toodle-Oo" (Duke Ellington, Bubber Miley) - 4:26
"C-Jam Blues" (Duke Ellington) - 5:45
"Sophisticated Lady" (Duke Ellington, Irving Mills, Mitchell Parish - 3:28
"Take the "A" Train" (Billy Strayhorn) - 3:21

Personnel
 Dave Grusin – piano, synthesizers, conductor
 Clark Terry – trumpet
 George Bohanon – trombone
 Tommy Johnson – tuba
 Tom Scott – saxophone
 Pete Christlieb – saxophone
 Brian O'Connor – French Horn
 John Clark – English horn, oboe
 Eddie Daniels – clarinet
 John Lowe – bass clarinet
 Brian Bromberg – bass
 John Pattitucci – bass
 Harvey Mason – drums

Charts

References

External links
Dave Grusin-Homage To Duke at Discogs

1993 albums
Dave Grusin albums
Duke Ellington tribute albums
GRP Records albums